Puliciphora borinquenensis is a species of scuttle flies (insects in the family Phoridae).

References

Further reading

 

Phoridae
Articles created by Qbugbot
Insects described in 1906